Roberto Alberto Rossi (1 November 1922 – 2 July 2017) was a British-Italian gangster and former associate of the Kray twins known as the "General of Clerkenwell". He stood trial for murder in 1975 but was acquitted. A journalist linked him to 11 murders, a figure which he did not dispute.

Early life 
Roberto Alberto Rossi or Bert Rossi was born in 1922 to immigrant Italian parents in Little Italy, London. As a young boy he got the nickname "Battles" because with his mums Italian accent "Berto" would sound like "Battles", he also had this name because he was known to be violent and at one point he seriously injured another child because he mocked his mother's accent. At the time the area was a slum and home to various Italian gangs such as the Sabinis. As a young teen he dropped out of school and after passing through some legitimate employment he started working as a driver for HarryBoy Sabini.

Gang years 
After his time with the Sabinis he worked with another British-Italian gangster from Little Italy by the name of Albert Dimes. During this time he ran nightclubs in Soho where he would deal Cocaine but not Heroin. Later in 1956 he was jailed along with "mad" Frankie Fraser for attacking the British-Jewish gangster Jack "the spot" Comer. While he was in prison he met Ronnie Kray who he thought was "mad as a hatter" but chose to mentor anyway. After that in the 1960s he would become an associate of the Italian-American Mafia and helped them infiltrate London's west end. He would act as an enforcer for them both in the U.K and the U.S but his favourite job was when he would be the protection for American boxers when they came to the U.K such as Rocky Marciano, Willie Pep, Joe Louis and Sonny Liston. He would retire in 1975 after being acquitted of the murder of Beatrice “Biddy” Gold although he would continue to do occasional consultancy work.

After retirement 
He would go on to live next door to Boris Johnson. In his later years Bert, had a relationship with another Englishwoman, Mary and would spend his time around the rapidly gentrifying Little Italy where he would focus on his family and lose much of his money to gambling. He died on 2 July 2017 at the age of 94 only a short amount of time after releasing his autobiography. His service was held at St Peters Italian Church in Little Italy where the theme music from The Godfather and Once upon a time in America were played. His death was reported as the end of the era when Clerkenwell was controlled by mobsters.

References

Further reading
Morton, James. (2017) Bert Rossi: Britain's oldest London gangland boss. National Crime Syndicate Publishing.

External links

1922 births
2017 deaths
People from Clerkenwell
English people of Italian descent
English criminals
Criminals from London
American Mafia